Vasily Pavlovich Rochev (born 22 December 1951 in the village of Bakur, Izhemsky District, Komi ASSR) is a former Soviet/Russian cross-country skier who competed in the 1970s and early 1980s, training at Dynamo in Syktyvkar. He won two medals for the Soviet Union at the 1980 Winter Olympics in Lake Placid, New York, with a gold in the 4 × 10 km relay and a silver in the 30 km.

Rochev also won two medals at the 1974 FIS Nordic World Ski Championships with a silver in the 4 × 10 km relay and a bronze in the 15 km.

Married to Nina Selyunina, he is the father of Vasily Rochev who won the bronze medal in the team sprint at the 2006 Winter Olympics in Turin, and four medals at the FIS Nordic World Ski Championships in Oberstdorf with a gold in the individual sprint (2005), silvers in the team sprint and relay (both 2007), and a bronze in the 4 × 10 km relay (2007).

Cross-country skiing results
All results are sourced from the International Ski Federation (FIS).

Olympic Games
 2 medals – (1 gold, 1 silver)

World Championships
 2 medals – (1 silver, 1 bronze)

References

External links
 
 
 Biography and photo 
 

1951 births
Soviet male cross-country skiers
Russian male cross-country skiers
Dynamo sports society athletes
Cross-country skiers at the 1976 Winter Olympics
Cross-country skiers at the 1980 Winter Olympics
Olympic cross-country skiers of the Soviet Union
Medalists at the 1980 Winter Olympics
Olympic gold medalists for the Soviet Union
Olympic silver medalists for the Soviet Union
Olympic medalists in cross-country skiing
FIS Nordic World Ski Championships medalists in cross-country skiing
People from Izhemsky District
Living people
Sportspeople from the Komi Republic